This is a list of trade unions in Quebec, Canada.

Trade union centres

FTQ-affiliated federations

CSN-affiliated federations

Public sector federations

Private sector federations

CSQ-affiliated federations

CSD-affiliated federations

Independent Unions

References

See also
List of trade unions

Trade unions in Quebec
 
Lists of trade unions
Trade unions in Quebec
Trade unions